1 Clinton Street (previously known as 280 Cadman Plaza West) is a primarily residential building under development in the Brooklyn Heights neighborhood of Brooklyn in New York City. The building will replace a preexisting branch of the Brooklyn Public Library. It is being developed by Hudson Companies and designed by Marvel Architects.

History
The Brooklyn Public Library's Brooklyn Heights Library at 280 Cadman Plaza was built in 1962. The two-story library was originally designed to serve as a library and a fallout shelter. During the next half-century, the building had accrued many defects in need of overdue maintenance. The Department of Design and Construction and a third party consultant separately assessed the property and agreed that the building had roughly $9 million worth of overdue capital needs. The building needed $3.6 million for a new heating, ventilation, and air cooling system. $4.2 million were needed for upgrades to the boiler, lighting, roof, and site drainage. $1 million would be required for new elevators. Lastly, $500,000 were needed for fire safety and security enhancements, which are held to a higher standard since the building was built. These large outstanding costs were big contributing factors in the decision to redevelop the location.

Revised renderings of the structure were released in June 2015. In addition, as part of the project, 114 units of affordable housing will be built on two privately owned sites in Community Board 2. The affordable housing will not utilize any public subsidy. At the time, New York City's three public library systems had seen increasing patronage and insufficient public funding for repair and capital costs. The residential project allowed the construction of a new library, which removed the need to perform maintenance on the existing facility. The Brooklyn Heights Library was relocated to 109 Remsen Street, five blocks from the current location, to a renovated space at Our Lady of Lebanon Church. The interim library opened to the public in July 2016.

Demolition plans for the site were filed and approved in March 2017, and demolition proceeded as planned. , construction on the library was set to be completed in mid-2021.

Design
Hudson Companies, the developer of the project, is looking to turn the public library into a 36-story condominium building with a new high-tech public library at the base. The new building will be  with as much as   square feet total. The new designs have a total of 134 total units. 8 apartments will be placed on the second floor of the building, twelve units will be on the third floor, and eight on the fourth. All of the floors above that will have fewer, larger, units. The average size of the units will be , with a total of  allocated to residential space. The lower three floors which will replace the old Brooklyn Heights Library and span . The main entrance to the library will be on Cadman Plaza West. The building will also include a  STEM Lab which will be made available to students in school district 13. Finally, a  retail space will take up the remainder of the first floor.
 
The architects of record for the new library and condominium (Marvel Architects) have gone with a contemporary design that should be practical while incorporating minimalism which will reduce how dated the building looks as it ages. As Marvel Architects states, “a minimalist, highly repetitive, gridded facade clad in limestone gives the building an elegant presence within the varied urban context. The building’s distinct shape comes from its triangular footprint, creating three façades that address different parts of the city: the harbor to the southwest, Manhattan’s Midtown to the north, and the carpet of brownstone Brooklyn to the east.”

There is some controversy regarding the two bas-reliefs which were made by Clemente Spampinato, which had to be removed before demolition could commence. Deputy Director of the PDC Keri Butler said of the bas-reliefs, “The Public Design Commission has reviewed the methods and materials for removing the artworks from the facade of the library and temporarily storing them, and has found these methods to be appropriate with the understanding that a proposal for relocating the artworks within the new development at 280 Cadman Plaza West will be submitted by September 2017.”

Controversy
The sale of the building caused controversy. The site previously held a branch of the Brooklyn Public Library, and initial proposals involving the sale of the site were opposed by two organizations: Citizens Defending Libraries and Love Brooklyn Libraries. Concerns included increased traffic, overpopulation of the local schools, the decrease of the library's space, and worries over the developer's pledge to provide affordable housing. The Brooklyn Public Library provided a defense of the sale, stating in front of city council that it receives insufficient funds from the city. However, a complaint sent to the city and state attorney general alleges that the Public Library has over $100 million in unspent funds.

Usage
The building will be residential, with the exception of a small retail space and first floor library branch. As part of the deal through which Hudson was given development rights, 114 units of affordable housing will be built in Clinton Hill. The project also includes a dedicated science, technology, engineering and mathematics (STEM) education lab for the local school district and a small library branch in DUMBO, amenities negotiated by Councilmember Stephen Levin during the Uniform Land Use Review Procedure (ULURP) process.

References

Residential buildings in Brooklyn
Proposed buildings and structures in New York City
Brooklyn Heights